This is a worldwide list of horse-drawn railways, an early form of rail transport that utilised horses and other similar animals to pull rail cars.

Examples

Before 1800

Horses were used to pull railways in funiculars and coal mines as early as early 16th century. The earliest recorded example is the Reisszug, a. inclined railway dating to 1515. Almost all of the mines built in 16th and 17th century used horse-drawn railways as their only mode of transport.

1800-1849

1850-1879

After 1880

Shunting 
Horses were widely used for shunting.
 Burra
 Dry Creek, ICI works

Bibliography 
 Discovering Britain's First Railways - A guide to Horse-drawn Tramroads and Waggonways, by Mark Jones. The History Press 2012. pp144. Map shows locations of 40 Waggonways with a bibliography of 40 books.

See also 

 Corduroy road
 Horsecar

References

External links 
 The oldest surviving horse drawn tramway operating in Douglas on the Isle of Man
 Horse Railway

 *